Tepe Gawra (Kurdish for "Great Mound") is an ancient Mesopotamian settlement 15 miles NNE of Mosul in northwest Iraq that was occupied between 5000 and 1500 BC. It is roughly a mile from the site of Nineveh and 2 miles E of the site of Khorsabad. It contains remains from the Halaf period, the Ubaid period, and the Uruk period (4000–3100 BC). Tepe Gawra contains material relating to the Halaf-Ubaid Transitional period c. 5,500–5,000 BC.

Archaeology

A brief exploratory dig was performed by Austen Layard before 1850. The site was formally excavated in 1927, 1931, 1932 and 1934-35 by archaeologists from a joint expedition of the University of Pennsylvania and the American Schools of Oriental Research, led by Ephraim Avigdor Speiser.

In 2001, Mitchell Rothman reanalyzed the data from previous excavations that did not use precise stratigraphic techniques. He considerably clarified the stratigraphy of the site.

Tell Arpachiyah is a contemporary Neolithic site nearby.

Occupation history

Excavations at Tepe Gawri revealed 16 levels showing that the Tepe Gawra site was occupied from approximately 5000 BC to 1500 BC. They include the earliest known temple to be decorated with pilasters and recesses. The Gawra Period (3500–2900 BC) is named for the site.  The earliest temple was dated to the LC2 period, approximately 4200 BC.

Earliest use of gold
According to Daniel Potts, the earliest evidence for gold or electrum use in the Near East comes from Ur and Tepe Gawra; a few small artifacts, such as wire and beads, have been found at these sites. At Tepe Gawra, the use of gold and electrum continued into the Early Dynastic period, starting about 2900 BC.

Several objects from levels 12 to 8 (mid-fourth to early-third millennium BC) at Tepe Gawra were made of arsenical copper, which is quite early for Mesopotamia. Similar objects are also found in Fara (Shuruppak), also dating from Jamdat Nasr period.

See also
Cities of the Ancient Near East

References

Further reading
P. Butterlin (éd.), A propos de Tepe Gawra, le monde proto-urbain de Mésopotamie - About Tepe Gawra: a proto-urban world in Mesopotamia, Brepols Publishers, 2009, 
T. E. Davidson and Hugh McKerrell, The Neutron Activation Analysis of Halaf and 'Ubaid Pottery from Tell Arpachiyah and Tepe Gawra, Iraq, vol. 42, no. 2, pp. 155–167, 1980
E. A. Speiser, The Bearing of the Excavations at Tell Billa and at Tepe Gawra upon the Ethnic Problems of Ancient Mesopotamia, American Journal of Archaeology, vol. XXXVI, pp. 29–35, 1932
 E. A. Speiser, Excavations at Tepe Gawra 1, University of Pennsylvania Museum of Archaeology and Anthropology, 1935.
 Arthur Tobler,. Excavations at Tepe Gawra 2, University of Pennsylvania Museum of Archaeology and Anthropology, 1950
E. A. Speiser, New Discoveries at Tepe Gawra and Khafaje, American Journal of Archaeology, vol. 41, no. 2, pp. 190-193, 1937
Developments at Tell Billa and Tepe Gawra, Bulletin of the University Museum, University of Pennsylvania, vol. 3(3/4), pp. 94-95, 1932
Excavations at Tell Billa and Tepe Gawra, Bulletin of the University Museum, University of Pennsylvania, vol. 3(5), pp. 126-130, 1932

External links

Site finds from ASOR excavation at Penn Museum
EXCAVATING TEPE GAWRA IN THE ARCHIVES OF THE UNIVERSITY OF PENNSYLVANIA MUSEUM
Archaeological site photographs at Oriental Institute

Populated places established in the 5th millennium BC
Populated places disestablished in the 2nd millennium BC
19th-century archaeological discoveries
Archaeological sites in Iraq
Former populated places in Iraq
Nineveh Governorate
Halaf culture
Ubaid period
Tells (archaeology)
Uruk period